National Highway 351, commonly called NH 351 is a national highway in  India. It is a spur road of National Highway 51. NH-351 traverses the state of Gujarat in India.

Route 
Mahuva, Saverkundla, Amreli, Bagasara, Jetpur.

Junctions  
 
  near Mahuva.
  near Amreli.
  near Jetpur.

See also 
List of National Highways in India
List of National Highways in India by state

References

External links 

 NH 351 on OpenStreetMap

National highways in India
National Highways in Gujarat